The First Federal of Sarasota Classic, also known as the Virginia Slims of Sarasota,  was a women's tennis tournament played on outdoor green clay courts at the Palm Aire Racquet Club in Sarasota, Florida in the United States that was part of the 1974 Virginia Slims World Championship Series. It was the second edition of the tournament and was held from April 8 through April 14, 1974. First-seeded Chris Evert won the singles title and earned $10,000 first-prize money.

Finals

Singles
 Chris Evert defeated  Evonne Goolagong 6–4, 6–0
 It was Evert's 4th singles title of the year and the 27th of her career.

Doubles
 Chris Evert /  Evonne Goolagong defeated  Tory Fretz /  Ceci Martinez 6–2, 6–2

Prize money

References

Virginia Slims of Sarasota
Virginia Slims of Sarasota
Virginia Slims of Sarasota
Virginia Slims of Sarasota